The 2009 FIU Golden Panthers football team represented Florida International University in the 2008 NCAA Division I FBS football season. The team was coached by Mario Cristobal and played their homes games at the on-campus FIU Stadium. The Golden Panthers finished the season 3–9 and 3–5 in the Sun Belt Conference.

Schedule

Game summaries

Alabama

Rutgers

Toledo

Louisiana-Monroe

Western Kentucky

Troy

Arkansas State

Louisiana-Lafayette

Middle Tennessee

North Texas

Florida

Florida Atlantic

Coaching staff

References

FIU
FIU Panthers football seasons
FIU Golden Panthers football